Descendant is a 2022 American historical documentary film directed by Margaret Brown, chronicling the story behind Africatown in Alabama, and the descendants of the last known enslaved Africans brought to the United States aboard the Clotilda.  The film premiered at the 2022 Sundance Film Festival, where it was picked up for wider distribution by Higher Ground Productions and Netflix.  It received a theatrical release on October 21, 2022 and was available to stream on Netflix that day as well.

Synopsis 
The wreckage of the Clotilda was found in 2019 in the Mobile River of Alabama, and the film explores the community of Africatown and the descendants of some of the last known enslaved Africans that were brought to the United States aboard her 40 years after slavery had already been deemed a capital offense.

Production and release
After the wreckage of the Clotilda was discovered, director Margaret Brown spent four years with the residents of Africatown examining how the discovery impacted the lives of descendants of the last known slaves brought to the US.  Brown also produced the film alongside Kyle Martin and Essie Chambers for Participant and Take One Five Entertainment.  The film premiered at the 2022 Sundance Film Festival, after which it was picked up by Higher Ground Productions and Netflix for theatrical and streaming distribution.  It continued on the festival circuit at the SXSW Festival as a Festival Favorite.  The film was released to select theaters and on Netflix on October 21, 2022.

Reception 
The review aggregator website Rotten Tomatoes reported an approval rating of 100%, with an average score of 8.4/10, based on 68 reviews. The website's critical consensus reads, "Descendant serves as a fantastically compelling example of how history can be reclaimed -- and a stirring tribute to a resilient community."  On Metacritic, it has a weighted average score of 88 out of 100 based on 12 critic reviews, indicating "universal acclaim". Jake Coyle called it "One of the best films of the year" in his review for the Associated Press.

Accolades

References

External links 
 
 
 

2020s English-language films
2022 documentary films
American documentary films
Films about slavery
Higher Ground Productions films
Participant (company) films
2022 independent films
Sundance Film Festival award winners